Vitali Yudin (born 17 June 1974) is a former Russian football player.

Yudin played in the 1992 Russian Top League with FC Tekstilshchik Kamyshin.

References

1974 births
Living people
Soviet footballers
Russian footballers
FC Tekstilshchik Kamyshin players
Russian Premier League players
Association football midfielders